The greater large-headed shrew (Paracrocidura maxima) is a species of mammal in the family Soricidae. It is found in Burundi, Democratic Republic of the Congo, Rwanda, and Uganda. Its natural habitats are subtropical or tropical moist lowland and montane forests, and swamps.

References

Paracrocidura
Taxonomy articles created by Polbot
Mammals described in 1959
Taxa named by Henri Heim de Balsac